The 1965 Swedish speedway season was the 1965 season of motorcycle speedway in Sweden.

Individual

Individual Championship
The 1965 Swedish Individual Speedway Championship final was held on 16 October in Stockholm. Göte Nordin won the Swedish Championship.

Junior Championship
 
Winner - Therje Henriksson

Team

Team Championship
Getingarna won division 1 and were declared the winners of the Swedish Speedway Team Championship for the third consecutive season and fourth time in total. The Getingarna team contained Göte Nordin, Leif Larsson and Bengt Jansson.

Gamarna won the second division, while Lejonen and Kaparna B won the third division A & B respectively.

See also 
 Speedway in Sweden

References

Speedway leagues
Professional sports leagues in Sweden
Swedish
Seasons in Swedish speedway